Estêvão Pires de Alpoim (1520-1570s) was a Portuguese nobleman. He served as Notary of government in the Azores Islands.

Biography 

Alpoim was born in Santa Maria Island, the son of Pedro Annes d'Alpoim, one of the first settlers of Azores, and África Anes, a noblewoman, born in Portugal. His wife was Grimanesa Pires, daughter of Pedro Vaz Marinheiro.

His son Estêvão de Alpoim was an nobleman from the Royal House of Portugal. He was married to Isabel Velha, possible descendant of Fernão Velho.

References

External links 
biblioteca-genealogica-lisboa.org
Frei Gonçalo Velho - archive.org

1520 births
1570s deaths
Portuguese nobility
16th-century Portuguese people
People from Santa Maria Island